Bernard Emmanuel Spitzer (April 26, 1924 – November 1, 2014) was an American real estate developer and philanthropist.

Early life and education
Spitzer was born to Molly and Morris Spitzer, Jewish Austrian immigrants from Tulste, Poland (now Ukraine) to New York's Lower East Side after World War I. They operated a print shop. Bernard received an engineering degree from City College of New York in 1943 at the age of 18. He earned a degree in engineering from Columbia University School of Engineering in 1947.

Spitzer initially tried his hand at civil engineering shortly after his graduation from Columbia but turned instead to real estate development (under Spitzer Engineering). Spitzer was based in New York City where he operated apartment buildings and built several landmark buildings around the city including The Corinthian, which was the largest individual apartment building in New York City when it was built.

Real estate developer
Among the buildings Spitzer has built are:

1020 Park Avenue (1962), a 20-story co-op apartment at East 85th Street and Park Avenue
1050 Fifth Avenue (1958), a 20-story residential building at East 86th Street and Fifth Avenue
200 Central Park South (1963), a 35-story residential building at Seventh Avenue and Central Park that is noted for its curved walls and a driveway that angles across the front of the building (other buildings along Central Park South are square)
210 Central Park South (1966), a 24-story residential building next door to 200 Central Park South
985 Fifth Avenue (1968), a 25-story residential building on the site of now demolished the Isaac Vail Brokaw Mansion
220 East 72nd Street (1974), a 28-story mixed-use residential-institutional building—the first five of which are occupied by Marymount Manhattan College (where Anne taught)
800 Fifth Avenue (1978), a 34-story rental apartment building at 61st Street
The Corinthian (New York) (1988), 57-story  building occupying an entire block  between 37th and 38th on First Avenue
150 East 57th Street (2000), a 34-story residential building

His New York buildings are leased by his subsidiary Urbana Properties, created in 2005.

In addition, Spitzer purchased several prominent commercial properties over the years, including: 

730 Fifth Avenue (The Crown Building or Heckscher Building), New York City, a two-floor neo-classical office building completed in 1921 by Warren & Wetmore and acquired in 1991 for $95 million.
2001 K Street (William P. Rogers Building), NW, Washington, D.C., 11-floor commercial and retail building completed in 2000 for $69 million and acquired in 2001 for $95 million.
1615 L Street, NW, Washington, D.C., 13-floor post-modern glass curtain wall commercial building completed in 1984 and acquired in 2009 for $180 million.
4800 Hampden Lane (One Bethesda Center), Bethesda, Maryland, 13-floor commercial and retail complex completed in 1986 and acquired in 2011 for $90 million.
350 West Broadway, New York, NY, 11,000 sf, two-story, retail property acquired in 2013.

Philanthropy
Anne and Bernard Spitzer Hall of Human Origins at the American Museum of Natural History
Anne and Bernard Spitzer Chair in Political Science at the City University of New York
Anne and Bernard Spitzer School of Architecture at the City College of City University of New York
The Spitzer Family Program Fund for U.S. Health Policy at Princeton University

Controversies
In 2007, Governor Eliot Spitzer (son of Bernard) appointed Dale Hemmerdinger president of the Metropolitan Transportation Authority. Before being confirmed for that position, Hemmerdinger had to resign from the all-white, mostly Jewish Harmonie Club. It was then revealed that Bernard had been a member of the club for more than 30 years.

Also in August 2007, Republican strategist Roger Stone was accused of leaving this message on Bernard's office answering machine during the "Troopergate" scandal in which his son Eliot was accused of using state troopers to spy on Majority Leader of the New York State Senate Joseph Bruno: "This is a message for Bernard Spitzer.  You will be subpoenaed to testify before the Senate committee on investigations on your shady campaign loans.  You will be compelled by the Senate sergeant at arms.  If you resist this subpoena, you will be arrested and brought to Albany. And there's not a goddamn thing your phony, psycho, piece-of-shit son can do about it. Bernie, your phony loans are about to catch up with you.  You will be forced to tell the truth.  And the fact that your son's a pathological liar will be known to all." Stone initially denied involvement but eventually resigned as a consultant to the New York State Senate Republican Campaign Committee, at the request of Joseph Bruno.

Personal life and death
He was married to Anne Goldhaber whom he courted in the Catskills. They had three children: daughter Emily Spitzer (born 1955), a lawyer, Daniel Spitzer (born 1957), a neurosurgeon, and Eliot Spitzer (born 1959), former New York Governor. According to biographers, during a game of Monopoly between father and son, the elder Spitzer would order his seven- or eight-year-old son, Eliot, to sell him a piece of property, which, later in the game, the future governor could not afford. In this way the father taught his son: "Never defer to authority." To support Eliot's foray into politics, Bernard made a loan to his son of $5 million during the first two campaigns and paid him $200,000 per year. As of 2006, the Bernard and Anne Spitzer Charitable Trust had donated at least $140,000 to organizations led by political allies.

Bernard Spitzer died on November 1, 2014, from Parkinson's disease at the age of 90. As of 2008, he had an estimated net worth of $500 million. He left each of his three children $50 million and donated $250 million to the Bernard and Anne Spitzer Charitable trust.

Bibliography
Paterson, David "Black, Blind, & In Charge: A Story of Visionary Leadership and Overcoming Adversity."Skyhorse Publishing. New York, New York, 2020

References

1924 births
2014 deaths
American civil engineers
American construction businesspeople
American people of Polish-Jewish descent
American people of Russian-Jewish descent
American people of Ukrainian-Jewish descent
American real estate businesspeople
Businesspeople from New York City
City College of New York alumni
Eliot Spitzer
Jewish American philanthropists
Engineers from New York City
Philanthropists from New York (state)
Columbia School of Engineering and Applied Science alumni